Ángel Pacheco (Buenos Aires, April 13, 1793 – Ditto., September 25, 1869), was an Argentine military officer trained by José de San Martín who later became one of the top commanders in the Confederacy during the dictatorship of Juan Manuel de Rosas. He never lost a battle under his command.

Early life and family
His birthplace is unclear, as some sources say he was born in Buenos Aires in July 1793, but others, such as the historian Carlos Calvo, say he was born in Santiago de Chile. Other sources say he was born in Buenos Aires but in June 1795. His parents were Julián Pacheco, a Spaniard, and Teresa Concha, who was Chilean. He studied at the Royal College of San Carlos.

In 1822, he married María Dolores Reinoso and had six children: José, Román, Julio, Eduardo, Pablo and Elvira.

Early career
In 1811, he joined Patricios Regiment as a cadet, but on November 22, the year after he was reassigned to the Horse Grenadiers Regiment. This unit had its baptism of fire at the Battle of San Lorenzo. His actions were responsible for providing food and horses for the Grenadiers advancing to San Lorenzo, and as a forward observer in combat he earned a promotion to lieutenant of the first squadron on February 26, 1813. He remained in the convent of San Carlos with a squad of 40 men, with which he defeated a larger landing force in the battle of Rincón de Zárate. He also served in the Siege of Montevideo.

In November 1813, he transferred to the Northern Army, and on 4 December was promoted to lieutenant. He covered the withdrawal of Cuban troops after their defeat at Ayohuma Vilcapugio and participated in the actions of then Keeper of the Marquis, Marketing and Media and Sipe Sipe, in which he received a large wound in the arm. In 1815 he was promoted to adjutant.

In 1816 he was transferred to Mendoza, where he joined the Army of the Andes, crossing to Chile under General José de San Martín in the column of Mariano Necochea, whose escort was a part. Under the command of Necochea, he participated in the combat of bribery. He fought in the Battle of Chacabuco (12 February 1817), earning a promotion to captain which was conferred on 27 February. He left Buenos Aires to bring trophies in Chacabuco, the Supreme Director Pueyrredón promoted him to sergeant major on 10 March. Back in Chile, he participated in the battles of Curapaligue, Talcahuano, Cancharayada and Maipú. He led  the second campaign in southern Chile during 1818 and 1819.

Shortly after the Battle of Cepeda he left to serve in Buenos Aires, and was ordered by Governor Manuel Dorrego to lead the campaign against the province of Santa Fe, fighting for the victories at San Nicolas de los Arroyos and Arroyo Pavón, where he defeated Gamonal. For many years he served in the cavalry of the frontier against the Indians ranqueles.

He has commanded a battalion of cavalry in the War of Brazil, and excelled in the victory of Ituzaingó. He was the second chief of the No. 3 Cavalry Regiment, whose chief was Colonel Frederick Brandsen, who died in combat. In that same field of battle he took command of the regiment. He also fought in small final battles of the war, including the Camacuá. After the latter, the May 1, 1827 Colonel received shipments of cash, and on 7 September was appointed commander in chief of the Northern Department of the province of Buenos Aires.

Civil War and the Indian border
In 1828, Colonel Frederick Rauch was replaced as head of the northern border with the Indians, based in Salto, by order of Governor Dorrego, which earned him the hatred of Prussia.

He was a school official and as such, wanted to remain detached from civil strife. But, as understood as a military mission was to sustain the constituted authorities, it resulted in civil war.

He refused to endorse John Lavalle in the revolution of December 1828 and wanted to help Dorrego, who was defeated before he could join, and finished in the refugee regiment Pacheco. His second in command, Mariano Acha, fell to the forces of the rebels and was arrested by Dorrego Lavalle, who shot him. He took refuge in Santa Fe and returned with Juan Manuel de Rosas, who led the campaign that ended with the defeat of Lavalle, after the battle of Puente de Márquez.

He later headed the campaign of 1831 against the League of Interior led by General Jose Maria Paz and Stephen Pederson. His victory was due to his correct tactics, but more importantly to the defection of many of the enemy soldiers, former soldiers of Facundo Quiroga forcibly incorporated into the army unit. With that victory began the fall of the League, which led him to occupy the city of Cordoba. Following his victory in Fraile Muerto he was promoted to colonel.

He made the desert campaign in 1833 as chief of staff to Rose, and reached what is now the city of Neuquén. On his return he was promoted to general, and during the crisis of those years he was elected governor, but denied the charge.

During the following years was a deputy provincial minister of war several times, and inspector of war. Rose was a personal friend, and became a major landowner, in large part due to awards from the government.

The campaign within
In August 1840, General Lavalle invaded the province of Buenos Aires, landing in San Pedro. Pacheco did not have enough forces to face him, so they scattered their horses and surrounded them. Lavalle rose to near Buenos Aires, but was trapped between the forces of Pacheco and Roses, resulting in their eventual defeat. Pacheco gave chase to Santa Fe under the command of General Manuel Oribe, former President of Uruguay, and his command fought at the Battle of Quebracho Herrado as head of the cavalry. Their federal action decided the victory.

When Lavalle came back to La Rioja, Mendoza sent Colonel Vilela their best forces. Pacheco with a smaller force, chased and defeated him during a surprise night attack in San Cala.

He returned to Cordoba, where months later went to Cuyo: there was going to the army unit Lamadrid. After taking San Juan, he retired to Mendoza. Pacheco took command of an army that included José Félix Mendoza Aldana and Nazario Benavides, with whom Lamadrid tore apart in the bloody battle of Rodeo del Medio. There ended the civil war started more than two years earlier.

In the battle of Arroyo Grande, 6 December 1842, ordered the army infantry affiliates of the Confederation and the "white" Uruguayan - whose commander in chief was deposed president Manuel Oribe East - against the forces of "red" Uruguayan and Argentine unit led by Fructuoso Rivera. Pacheco's conduct of the troops was decisive, destroying the center and the artillery of the enemy. During 1843 and 1844 participated in the siege of Montevideo.

In 1845 he was appointed head of the Frontier Centre Buenos Aires province, fought off attempts to raid ranqueles Indians, and ordered to form a strong and Mulitas Bragado (now the town of Twenty-May). In 1850 he was elected a member of the Legislature of the Province.

Later years and death
In 1851, Justo José de Urquiza took the lead in opposition to Rosas. After invading and overthrowing the Uruguay Oribe, also invaded Santa Fe, and from there moved to Buenos Aires. For the first time, Pacheco and Rosas disagreed with the strategy to follow, and the governor was wary of his general.

Feeling left out, Pacheco retired to his room. He then assumed command of the army, Brigadier General Rosas, a shrewd politician, but little military capacity. He was defeated at the Battle of Caseros, the February 2, 1852 and forced to resign and go into exile.

Pacheco also left home and traveled the American continent, with particular attention to Havana.

He returned to Buenos Aires after the revolution of 11 September that year, when Buenos Aires was dominated by the old unit and separated from the rest of the country. Organized the defence of the capital during the siege imposed on him general Hilario Lagos.

He retired military in mid-1853. During the following years he was minister of war of the State of Buenos Aires, and special envoy to the government of Brazil.

Spent the rest of his days in his stay Talar, now known as "Talar de Pacheco. "

According to Ernesto Quesada,
"asked not to be political either before, during or after Rosas. His badge of honor, glory, was to have been a soldier of St. Martin: she did not aspire to something else. born with the military vocation and she died without have given up only once in his life. He was a man of the world's legendary gallantry with the ladies, being known his deep respect for women in general. "

He died in Buenos Aires in 1869. In the act of burial of the remains discussed among others, the poet Carlos Guido y Spano and General Bartolomé Mitre. He was buried in the cemetery of Recoleta.

Notes
1. This year of birth would be more consistent with his record of military service, and that would be correct sitting position as a cadet at age 17 Patricios.

Bibliography
National Academy of History, Parties battle of the civil wars, BA, 1977.
Araoz de Lamadrid, Gregory, Memoirs, BA, 1895.
Beruti, Juan Manuel, Memoirs curious Emecé Ed, BA, 2001.
Beverin, John, The campaigns of the liberating armies 1838–1852, BA, 1923.
Bischoff, Efraín U., SANCAL's surprise, magazine Todo es Historia, no. 257.
Busa, José Luis, Historia Argentina. Taurus Ed, BA, 2005. 
Camogli, Paul, battles for freedom, Ed Aguilar, BA, 2005. 
Cutolo, Vicente, Nuevo Argentine biographical dictionary, Ed Elche, Buenos Aires, 1968–1985.
Irazusta, July, political life of Juan Manuel de Rosas through correspondence. Ed Albatros, Buenos Aires, 1943.
Mitre, Bartolomé, Historia de San Martín and South American emancipation. Eudeba Ed, BA, 1968.
Paz, Gustavo L., The Civil Wars (1820–1870), EUDEBA, BA, 2007. 
Quesada, Ernesto, Acha and battle Angaco, Ed Plus Ultra, Buenos Aires, 1965.
Quesada, Ernesto, Lavalle and the battle of Quebracho Herrado, Ed Plus Ultra, Buenos Aires, 1965.
Quesada, Ernesto, Pacheco and the campaign of Cuyo, Ed Plus Ultra, Buenos Aires, 1965.
Ras, Norberto, War by cows, Ed Galerna, BA, 2006. 
Rosas, Juan Manuel, Journal of the expedition to the desert, Ed Plus Ultra, Buenos Aires, 1965.
Rube, Julio Horacio, The Way Home. Memorial de la Patria, Volume IX, Ed La Bastille, BA, 1984.
Ruiz Moreno, Isidoro J., Argentine military campaigns, Volume II, Ed Emecé, BA, 2006. 
Saldías, Adolfo, History of Argentina Confederation, Ed Hyspamérica, BA, 1987.

1793 births
Argentine generals
1869 deaths
Burials at La Recoleta Cemetery
Patrician families of Buenos Aires